Poland competed at the 1972 Winter Olympics in Sapporo, Japan.

Medalists

Alpine skiing

Men

Men's slalom

Biathlon

Men

 1 One minute added per close miss (a hit in the outer ring), two minutes added per complete miss.

Men's 4 x 7.5 km relay

 2 A penalty loop of 200 metres had to be skied per missed target.

Cross-country skiing

Men

Women

Women's 3 × 5 km relay

Figure skating

Pairs

Ice hockey

First round
Winners (in bold) entered the Medal Round. Other teams played a consolation round for 7th-11th places.

|}

Medal round

Czechoslovakia 14-1 Poland
Finland 5-1 Poland
Sweden 5-3 Poland
USSR 9-3 Poland
USA 6-1 Poland
Team Roster
Walery Kosyl
Andrzej Tkacz
Ludwik Czachowski
Marian Feter
Stanislaw Fryslweicz
Robert Goralczyk
Adam Kopszynski
Jerzy Potz
Andrzej Szczepaniec
Jozef Batkiewicz
Krzysztof Bialynicki
Stefan Chowaniec
Feliks Goralczyk
Tadeusz Kacik
Tadeusz Obloj
Jozef Slovakiewicz
Leszek Tokarz
Wieslaw Tokarz
Walenty Zietara

Luge

Men

(Men's) Doubles

Women

Nordic combined 

Events:
 normal hill ski jumping 
 15 km cross-country skiing

Ski jumping

References
Official Olympic Reports
International Olympic Committee results database
 Olympic Winter Games 1972, full results by sports-reference.com

Nations at the 1972 Winter Olympics
1972
1972 in Polish sport